Bożena Karkut (born 30 June 1961) is a Polish handball coach for Metraco Zagłębie Lubin.

References

1961 births
Living people
Sportspeople from Wrocław
Polish handball coaches